The Nepal national badminton team represents Nepal in international badminton team competitions. The Nepalese national team is controlled by the Nepal Badminton Association, the governing body for badminton in Nepal. 

Nepal competed in the Sudirman Cup in 1989. The mixed team would later compete for a second time in 2019. The men's team participated in the Badminton Asia Team Championships in 2016 and 2018. The Nepalese men's and women's team also competes in the South Asian Games.

History 
Badminton was introduced to Nepal in the 1950s when it was widely encouraged as a national sport by King Mahendra of Nepal whom later became the chairman of the Nepal Badminton Association in 1956. The national team was formed soon after the establishment of the Nepal Badminton Association. 

The Nepali team started competing in international team tournaments in the 1980s when the men's and women's team took part in qualifying for the Thomas Cup and the Uber Cup respectively. The Nepali men's and women's team also made their Asian Games debut at the 1986 Asian Games. In 1989, the Nepali team made their mixed team debut in the inaugural 1989 Sudirman Cup. The team lost in the group stages. 

In 2004, the Nepali men and women's team were sent to compete in the 9th South Asian Games and finished in 4th place. Both teams later competed for the next few Games and finished in third place. 

In 2014, the national men's team reached the quarter-finals at the 2014 Asian Games but lost to the Malaysian team with a score of 0-3. The Nepali men's team debuted in the Badminton Asia Team Championships in 2016 and competed for a second time in 2018. In 2019, the national mixed team made their second appearance at the 2019 Sudirman Cup. The team lost the classification round to Lithuania and were placed 28th in the final ranking.

Participation in BWF competitions
Sudirman Cup

Participation in Badminton Asia competitions
Men's team

Participation in South Asian Games 

Men's team

Women's team

Current squad 
The following players were selected to represent Nepal at the 2019 South Asian Games.
Male players
Jivan Acharya
Prince Dahal
Dipesh Dhami
Sunil Joshi
Bishnu Katwal
Praful Maharjan
Bikash Shrestha
Nabin Shrestha
Ratnajit Tamang
Sajan Krishna Tamrakar
Female players
Sobha Gauchan
Amita Giri
Jessica Gurung
Nita Lamsal
Rasila Maharjan
Anu Maya Rai
Sita Rai
Sima Rajbanshi
Pooja Shrestha
Nangsal Tamang

References

Badminton
National badminton teams
Badminton in Nepal